Fonogenico (フォノジェニコ) is a Japanese band. They are well known for their ballad and jazz songs and signed under BMG Japan. They debuted in May 2006 with their first single "Reason", which was featured as the first ending theme of the anime series xxxHOLiC. They also performed the theme song for the Japanese drama series Hyakki Yakoushou. They have not been active since the end of 2010.

Members

高山奈帆子 (Naoko Takayama) (born December 17 in Wakayama Prefecture) - vocals, lyrics (2003–present)
川口潤 (Masaru Kawaguchi) (born January 10 in Osaka Prefecture) - piano, keyboards, composition (2003–2008)

Discography

Singles

Reason (released May 31, 2006)

Reason
lovers
ノーサイド (No Side)

リズム (released July 19, 2006)

リズム (Rhythm)
Shalala
One Day Afternoon <party version>

オレンジの砂 (released May 23, 2007)

オレンジの砂 (Orange no Suna; Orange Sand)
オーロラパーティー (Aurora Party)
6月の絵画 (Rokugatsu no Kaiga; June Picture)

君がいない / 雨粒 (released December 1, 2007)

君がいない (Kimi ga Inai; You're Not Here)
雨粒 (Ametsubu; Raindrop)
水玉ダイアリー (Mizutama Diary; Polka Dot Diary)
Happy Merry Christmas

Mini-Albums

ねがいごと (released February 7, 2007)

Reason
ねがいごと (Negaigoto; Wish)
遠い街 (Tooi Machi; Distant Road)
lovers
Free
Shalala

External links
"Fonogenico" BMG Japan Official Site (Japanese)
Fonogenico Homepage  (Japanese)
Fonogenico-Naoko blog (Japanese)
Fonogenico MySpace page (Japanese)

Japanese girl groups